The Toronto Rock are a professional box lacrosse franchise based in Hamilton, Ontario, Canada. They are members of the Eastern Conference of the National Lacrosse League (NLL). The team was the first Canadian franchise in the NLL. Oakville resident Jamie Dawick is the current owner of the Rock, purchasing the team after the 2009 season. Since 2014, Dawick has also served as their general manager. The Rock play their home games at FirstOntario Centre which they currently share with the Hamilton Bulldogs of the OHL.

The franchise was founded in 1998 as the Ontario Raiders in Hamilton. The Raiders played at Copps Coliseum before being sold to a group of investors led by then Toronto Maple Leafs Assistant GM Bill Watters, who relocated the franchise to Toronto. They were subsequently renamed the "Toronto Rock", and began play at Maple Leaf Gardens in the 1999 season. The Toronto Rock won their 6th league championship on May 15, 2011. They hold a tie for the most championships in league history with the Philadelphia Wings. In the 2001 season, the Rock moved from the Maple Leaf Gardens to Scotiabank Arena (then known as Air Canada Centre) where they played for 20 seasons. On May 11, 2021, the team announced the relocation from Scotiabank Arena in Toronto to FirstOntario Centre in Hamilton, beginning with the 2021–22 NLL season in December. The team continues to represent Toronto while playing home games in Hamilton.

History

The franchise was founded as an NLL expansion team in Hamilton, Ontario and began play in the 1998 season. They were known as the Ontario Raiders, and played their home games at Copps Coliseum. Former Buffalo Bandits coach Les Bartley was hired to coach the new team, and he lured former Bandit Jim Veltman to join him, becoming the Raiders' captain. The team finished a respectable 6–6 in their inaugural season, but missed the playoffs on a tie-breaker.  Following the season, losses of $250,000 forced owner Chris Fritz to look for partners.  Maple Leaf Sports & Entertainment considered purchasing the team, but ultimately a group which included Bill Watters, the then Assistant General Manager of the Toronto Maple Leafs, Paul Beeston, former president of the Toronto Blue Jays, Tie Domi, player for the Maple Leafs, and Bobby Orr, former NHL player, bought it for $250,000 and promptly relocated the team to Toronto's Maple Leaf Gardens where they rebranded it the Toronto Rock, a name chosen to reflect the city's lively rock music scene.

Championships/Dynasty era (1999–2005)
In 1999, their first year in Toronto, the Rock won their first NLL Championship, defeating the Rochester Knighthawks 13–10 in Toronto. The next year, the Rock became the first team since the 1994-95 Wings to win back-to-back championships, once again defeating the Knighthawks. That game featured Kaleb Toth's dramatic game-winning goal with a second left on the clock, in the last-ever professional sporting event held at Maple Leaf Gardens.

2001 saw the Rock follow the Leafs to the Air Canada Centre, where they advanced to the championship game once again. But the visiting Philadelphia Wings held the Rock to just eight goals, and won their sixth championship. The next season, the Rock recovered from the championship game loss by finishing first overall for the fourth straight year. They advanced to the championship game once again, but for the first time as the visiting team. The Rock defeated the Albany Attack in Albany 13–12. 2002 was also one of the most productive years for the Rock in terms of awards; in addition to winning the Champion's Cup, three players were honoured by the league. Blaine Manning was named Rookie of the Year, Pat Coyle was named Defensive Player of the Year, and captain Jim Veltman was given the Sportsmanship Award.

In 2003, Toronto advanced to the championship game for the fifth straight year, once again as the visitors. The game was held in Rochester, where Rock had never won a game, but they prevailed in the lowest-scoring championship game in NLL history, winning 8–6.

Shortly before the 2004 season began, head coach and GM Les Bartley announced that he was fighting colon cancer, and was stepping down. Assistant coaches Ed Comeau and Derek Keenan were named interim coach and interim GM respectively. After a 2–4 start to the season, Comeau and Keenan were fired, and the Rock hired Terry Sanderson to try to turn the team around. The Rock went 8-2 the rest of the season, earning a first round bye after clinching the East Division regular season crown. However, the Buffalo Bandits came to town and upset the Rock 19–10, sending the Bandits to the first NLL championship game not featuring the Rock since they joined the league. Jim Veltman was honoured by the league by being named league MVP. This was the first year in the 10-year history of the award that it did not go to Gary Gait, Paul Gait, or John Tavares and the first Toronto Rock player to be named league MVP.

In 2005, the Rock defeated the Rochester Knighthawks in the East Division Final by a score of 12–10 in front of approximately 17,200 fans at the Air Canada Centre. The Rock went on to defeat the Arizona Sting with a 19–13 win in front of an NLL record crowd of 19,432, becoming NLL champions for the fifth time in seven years and solidifying their distinction as an NLL dynasty. Colin Doyle was named league MVP, the second straight year that the award was won by a Rock player.

Despite the championship, the season ended on a sad note for the Rock franchise, as Les Bartley died of cancer at the age of 51 the day after the championship game. Bartley is remembered as an exceptional coach, having led the Toronto Rock to NLL Championships in 1999, 2000, 2002, and 2003.

In 2004, the NLL Coach of the Year Award was renamed the Les Bartley Award in honour of Bartley.

Kloepfer era (2006–2009)
From 1999 to 2005, the Rock finished either first overall or first in their division every year, winning five championships. The next few years, however, would bring the franchise back down to Earth. The Rock struggled during the early part of the 2006 season; however, their record balanced out to 8–8 at season's end. They made the playoffs, only to be defeated by the first place Knighthawks at Blue Cross Arena in Rochester by a score of 16–8. Head coach and GM Terry Sanderson was fired after the season, and was replaced by new Director of Lacrosse Operations Mike Kloepfer and new head coach Glenn Clark. Clark had played eight seasons with the Rock and had just finished an All-Star season as a member of the Philadelphia Wings, but retired from playing to take the head coaching job with his old club.

Kloepfer made his mark on the team quickly, trading perennial All-Star, former Rookie of the Year and league MVP Colin Doyle to the San Jose Stealth along with Darren Halls and a draft pick for first overall draft pick Ryan Benesch, Kevin Fines, Chad Thompson and two draft picks. Benesch had a very good rookie year, scoring 33 goals and winning the Rookie of the Year award, but the Rock under rookie coach Clark struggled to a worst-ever 6–10 record, barely making the playoffs. They lost the division semifinal against Rochester, who would go on to win their first championship since 1997.

In 2007, the Toronto Rock established an award also called the Les Bartley Award, given to "the Rock player that best exemplifies Les' emphasis on the importance of character and commitment to the team". The first winner of this award was team captain Jim Veltman.

Toronto's struggles continued in 2008, as the Rock lost their last five games of the season. They finished below .500 for the second straight year, and for the first time since their move to Toronto in 1999, the Rock finished out of the playoffs. Despite the losing season, goaltender Bob Watson was named Goaltender of the Year. 2008 also featured the final season of the only captain the Rock franchise had ever had, Jim Veltman. Veltman retired after fifteen seasons in the NLL, winning seven championships (two with the Bandits and five with the Rock). Chris Driscoll was named the new Rock captain.

After starting the 2009 season with a 1–2 record, the Rock relieved Clark and assistant coach Veltman and Terry Bullen of their coaching duties, and hired former Chicago and Colorado coach Jamie Batley as the new Rock head coach. Clark and Bullen were fired, and Veltman was retained in an advisory position. The coaching change was not enough to propel the Rock back into the playoffs, however. They finished last in the East and out of the playoffs for the second straight year. Director of Lacrosse Operations Mike Kloepfer resigned shortly after the season ended.

Jamie Dawick era (2009–present)
On June 10, 2009, the Rock announced that former GM and coach Terry Sanderson had been brought back as the new GM. Jamie Batley was also told by the Rock that he would not be returning as head coach. At the end of the month, the team announced that the Rock had been sold to Oakville-based businessman James Dawick, with Waters saying the price was "in the seven figures." Two weeks later, former Calgary Roughnecks head coach Troy Cordingley was named as the new coach, giving the Rock an entirely new staff from ownership on down.

Sanderson wasted no time in the rebuilding efforts, most notably re-acquiring Colin Doyle from Washington in exchange for Lewis Ratcliff, Tyler Codron and Joel Dalgarno.
He also traded Luke Wiles to Washington and Bill McGlone to Philadelphia, and re-acquiring former Rock defender Sandy Chapman from Rochester. He then traded team captain Chris Driscoll to the Buffalo Bandits for another former Rock defender Phil Sanderson, and acquired Mike Hominuck from Edmonton and Pat McCready from Buffalo, both for draft picks.

The moves paid off immediately, as the Rock began the 2010 season 6-1 en route to a 9–7 record. This was good for second place in the East and the Rock's first playoff berth in four years. In the playoffs, the Rock defeated Buffalo and Orlando on their way to their seventh Championship game, and first since 2005. The Washington Stealth, in their first season in Everett, Washington, proved too strong for the Rock and won the Championship 15–11.

In 2011, the Rock found themselves in the Championship game for the second straight year against the Washington Stealth, this time winning 8–7.

In August 2011, Dawick broke ground on constructing the new $20 million-dollar, privately financed Toronto Rock Athletic Centre (TRAC) in Oakville.  The lacrosse facility, which opened in 2012, features two pads, one of which seats 500 fans, and serves as the Rock's practice facility as well as the team's offices.  The arena has played host to exhibition NLL games, the NLL Entry Draft and the NLL Combine.

On May 11, 2021, Dawick announced that the Rock would relocate from Scotiabank Arena in Toronto to FirstOntario Centre in Hamilton, Ontario with a five-year arena lease with an option to extend the agreement afterwards. Their relocation will commence in time for the beginning of the 2022 NLL season in December 2021. The team name will not be changed despite the relocation to Hamilton due their branding as a team that has "always represented the GTHA".

The Rock will temporarily relocate to a new arena for the 2024 season and all or part of the 2025 season while Hamilton's FirstOntario Centre is closed for renovations.

Awards and honours

Retired numbers

NLL Hall of Fame members
 Les Bartley (Class of 2006)
 Pat Coyle (Class of 2014)
 Johnny Mouradian (Class of 2008)
 Jim Veltman (Class of 2009)
 Dan Stroup (Class of 2010)
 Bob Watson (Class of 2011)
 Steve Dietrich (Class of 2012)
 Terry Sanderson (Class of 2015)

Current roster

All-time record

Notes

Playoff results

Head coaching history

† Bullen served as head coach during Clark's suspension.

See also

 Toronto Rock seasons
 Sports in Hamilton, Ontario

References

External links

Official Website

 
National Lacrosse League teams
Sports teams in Hamilton, Ontario
Ro
1998 establishments in Ontario
Lacrosse clubs established in 1998